Palpita pajnii is a moth in the family Crambidae. It was described by Jagbir Singh Kirti and H. S. Rose in 1992. It is found in China (Guangdong, Guangxi, Hainan, Guizhou, Yunnan), Taiwan, Vietnam, Thailand, Myanmar, Indonesia (Sumatra, Sulawesi, Java, Borneo), the Philippines, India, Nepal, Australia (Queensland), Norfolk Island and Papua New Guinea.

The wingspan is about 30 mm. Adults are satin white with brown eyes and a brown costa on the forewings.

References

External links
Original description: Kirti, J. S. & Rose, H. S. (1992). "Studies on Indian species of the genus Palpita Hübner (Lepidoptera: Pyralidae: Pyraustinae)". J. Ent. Res. 16 (1): 62–77.

Moths described in 1992
Palpita
Moths of Asia
Moths of Oceania